Estola albocincta is a species of beetle in the family Cerambycidae. It was described by Melzer in 1932. It is known from Brazil and Paraguay.

References

Estola
Beetles described in 1932